Dinamita (also known simply as dynamite) is a deep-fried Filipino snack consisting of stuffed siling haba (long green chili peppers) wrapped in a thin egg crêpe. The stuffing is usually giniling (ground beef or pork), cheese, or a combination of both but it can also be adapted to use a wide variety of ingredients, including tocino, ham, bacon, tuna, and shredded chicken. Dinamita is also known as dynamite lumpia, among other names. It is a type of lumpia and it is commonly eaten as an appetizer or as a companion to beer.

Names
The name for the dish literally means "dynamite", due to its resemblance to a stick of dynamite with a long fuse; as well as a reference to the heat of the pepper. Since it is a type of lumpia, it is also known as "dynamite lumpia", "dynamite spring rolls", and "lumpiang dinamita". It also has other creative names like dynamite cheese sticks (with the filling consisting of cheddar or even mozzarella cheese), "barako finger", from Filipino barako (lit. "wild boar"), which has connotations of manliness equivalent to the English term "stud".

Description
Like most lumpia recipes, dinamita is very easy to prepare and can be modified readily. The stuffing, giniling (ground beef or pork), is sauteed beforehand with chopped onions and garlic, and seasoned with salt and black pepper to taste.

The pepper used in dinamita is the long and green siling haba pepper (also known as siling pansigang). The pepper is gently cut lengthwise and the pith and seeds removed, being careful to retain the stalk. It is then stuffed with the ground meat mixture and a strip of cheese (usually cheddar). The stuffed pepper is then wrapped in lumpia wrapper (a thin egg crêpe) with the stalk hanging out of one end. It is deep-fried until golden brown and served while still crispy.

It is eaten as is or dipped into common lumpia dipping sauces like banana ketchup, sweet and sour sauce, garlic mayonnaise, honey mustard, or vinegar with labuyo peppers and calamansi. It is usually eaten as an appetizer or as pulutan (finger food) with beer or other alcoholic drinks.

Variations
Siling haba has a "hot" rating in the Scoville scale, at 50,000 SHU. However, some or most of the heat is neutralized by the cheese and the fact that the seeds are removed. The heat can be adjusted by using another type of pepper. Jalapeño or serrano peppers, for example, will lower the spiciness; while habanero peppers will increase it. Another method is to mix the stuffing with finely chopped native labuyo peppers, which are much hotter than siling haba, with a Scoville scale rating of 80,000 to 100,000 SHU. Some of the seeds of the siling haba can also be retained to make it hotter, though too much can make it taste bitter.

The stuffing can similarly be adjusted to taste. Some variants of dinamita may further encase or stuff the pepper with tocino, ham, or bacon, for example, before rolling it into the lumpia wrapper. Others may exclude the cheese or use shredded chicken or even canned tuna. Other ingredients can also be added, like carrots or kintsay (Chinese celery). Some also prepare their lumpia breaded with panko breadcrumbs.

See also
Lumpiang keso
Lumpiang Shanghai
Lumpiang ubod
Bicol Express
Laing (food)
Jalapeño popper
Chile relleno
Lumpia mercon

References

Philippine cuisine
Stuffed vegetable dishes
Deep fried foods
Appetizers